Alamogordo Public Library is the public library serving Alamogordo, New Mexico and Otero County, New Mexico. The library has extensive collections of Spanish-language and German-language books and of materials related to the Western writer Eugene Manlove Rhodes.

History
Alamogordo Public Library first opened on March 1, 1900.
Alamogordo was unusual for a Southwestern town at the time in that it was a planned community, the planning being carried out by Charles Bishop Eddy's and John Arthur Eddy's Alamogordo Improvement Company. The Eddys saw a library as being necessary for their community and they gave financial support to the Alamogordo Woman's Club to start the library.
Ownership passed to an offshoot, the Alamogordo Library Association, and then to the Civic League.
The Civic League retained ownership of the library until 1958 when it was sold for one dollar to the City of Alamogordo.

The library had resided in a series of rented rooms until 1962 when a library building was constructed at 920 Oregon Avenue. John Reed of Albuquerque was the architect. The architect was again John Reed.

Bond elections in 2005 and 2009 to fund construction of the new building failed.

Services
Alamogordo Public Library is a city-owned library, but library cards are free to all residents of Otero County.
(County government pays a yearly subsidy to the city for this service; in FY 2008 the subsidy was $35,320.)
The library has 112,000 items in its collection, including books, videos, compact discs, and magazines. There are extensive collections of Spanish-language and German-language books. (The German Air Force has a tactical training center at Holloman Air Force Base near Alamogordo, and many German families live in the city.) Inter-library loan services are provided. Through the Alamogordo Public Library's inter-library loan service, patrons can request any type of material that is usually available at a public library, including books, photocopies, microfilm, consumer audio books, music CDs, and DVDs. The library installed a system for automating collection and catalog records in 1995, and the catalog became available over the Internet in 2004.

The library has 12 adult computers and 6 children's computers that are free to library customers and visitors. These provide Internet access and Microsoft Office programs; the children's computers have some educational programs. The library also offers free wireless Internet (WiFi) access.

The children's Summer Reading Program is held every year. There are entertainment programs throughout the summer, and prizes given to the best readers. In 2007 there were 1,496 children in the program.

A homebound delivery program at the library offers free selection and delivery of books to customers who find it difficult to come into the library. The program operates in cooperation with the Alamogordo Senior Center's Retired Senior and Volunteer Program.

Notable features and collections

The Story Book Wall is a collection of 247 tiles illustrating children's books and installed on the wall near the Children's Library. Drawings were created by local schoolchildren in 1963 and copied onto tiles. The project was carried out by the local chapter of American Association of University Women.

The Eugene Manlove Rhodes Room, constructed as part of the 1987 expansion, holds the library's collection of Southwest books and materials. Within the room are a bank teller wall rescued from a bank in Vaughn, New Mexico and desks and other pieces of furniture from the early 1900s. In 1958 the Civic League purchased W. H. Hutchinson's collection of Eugene Manlove Rhodes materials and donated them to the library. The collection consists of books, correspondence, clippings, some magazines, and a few original manuscripts. These items and some other Rhodes-related items collected by past library director June Harwell have been photocopied, cataloged, and scanned into computer files and are available to researchers.

Notes

External links
 Friends of the Alamogordo Public Library Advocacy group for the library.
 Alamogordo Public Library Foundation  Fundraising group for the library.
 Alamogordo Speaker Series Subcommittee of the Friends of the Library, that produces an annual event with regional and cultural significance to the Otero County community

Public libraries in New Mexico
Tourist attractions in Alamogordo, New Mexico
Alamogordo, New Mexico
Buildings and structures in Otero County, New Mexico
Education in Otero County, New Mexico
Library buildings completed in 1962